Rupert and the Ice Castle is a video game developed by Taskset and published by Bug-Byte in 1986. It was released for the Commodore 64 and ZX Spectrum. The game is based on Rupert Bear, a British cartoon and comics strip character created in 1920 by artist Mary Tourtel.

In this platform arcade game the player takes the role of Rupert Bear. Rupert's friends Bingo, Edward Trunk, Algy and Bill Badger have all been frozen by Jack Frost's (one of the characters of the story) evil sister, Jenny; while they were visiting Jack at the Ice Castle.

Gameplay
Rupert has a number of magic ice pills which will revive his friends. He must find and give each of them an ice pill in order to set them back to their hometown Nutwood. However Jenny has set some traps for Rupert. Each time Rupert is hit by a toy he will lose one ice pill. If he is left with no pills he becomes frozen himself.

There are three levels of play and each scene within those levels presents Rupert with a different number of problems. In the third level Rupert will find warm clothes scattered around the Ice Castle, which will help him keep warm as he searches for his friends. The character can run, jump, duck to avoid snowballs and slide along ice patches.

References
Rupert and the Ice Castle: zzap64.co.uk

External links

1986 video games
Commodore 64 games
Rupert Bear
Video games about bears
Video games about toys
Video games based on comics
Video games developed in the United Kingdom
Video games set in castles
ZX Spectrum games
Platform games
Single-player video games
Bug-Byte Software games